A ship class is a group of ships of a similar design. This is distinct from a ship type, which might reflect a similarity of tonnage or intended use.

In the course of building a class of ships, design changes might be implemented. In such a case, the ships of different design might not be considered of the same class; each variation would either be its own class, or a subclass of the original class (see  for an example). If ships are built of a class whose production had been discontinued, a similar distinction might be made.

Ships in a class often have names linked by a common factor: e.g. s' names all begin with T; and s are named after American battles. Ships of the same class may be referred to as sister ships.

Naval ship class naming conventions

Overview
The name of a naval ship class is most commonly the name of the lead ship, the first ship commissioned or built of its design.  However, other systems can be used without confusion or conflict. A descriptive name may be used; for example it was decided to group destroyers made to the same design as HMS Tomahawk, all named after weapons, as the  rather than Tomahawk class.

Europe in general
In European navies a class is named after the first ship commissioned regardless of when she was ordered or laid down.

Germany
The West German Navy (Bundesmarine) used a three-digit type number for every class in service or in advanced project state. Modified versions were identified by a single letter suffix. After the reunification of Germany the German Navy (Deutsche Marine) kept the system. Informally, classes are also traditionally named after their lead ships.

Indonesia

The Indonesian Navy has a traditional naming for its ships. Moreover, the ship's type and missions can be identified by the first number on the ship's three-digit hull number, which is placed on the front bows and the back of the stern. The naming convention is such as:

 Hull number beginning with 1 (reserved for aircraft carriers): great statesmen (Presidents, Vice Presidents, etc.)
 Hull number beginning with 2 (cruisers and destroyers): Indonesia's main islands (for cruisers) and National heroes (for destroyers)
 Hull number beginning with 3 (frigates, ocean escorts, corvettes): national heroes
 Hull number beginning with 4 (submarines, submarine tenders): mythical weapons (for submarines), National heroes (for submarine tenders)
 Hull number beginning with 5 (amphibious ships, LSTs, LPDs, LCUs, command ships): main and strategic bays (for LSTs), big cities (for LPDs), small cities (for LCUs), National heroes (for command ships)
 Hull number beginning with 6 (fast attack ships): mythical weapons (previous names for missile boats), traditional weapons (current names for fast missile boats), wild animals (for fast torpedo boats)
 Hull number beginning with 7 (minesweepers, minehunters, mine countermeasures ships): every island begin with letter "R"
 Hull number beginning with 8 (patrol boats): native fishes and sea creatures, native snakes and wild reptiles, wild insects, geographical places (such as towns, lakes or rivers begin with "si-", like Sikuda, Sigurot, Sibarau)
 Hull number beginning with 9 (supporting ships, oilers, tugs, troops transports, oceanographic research ships, sailing ships, etc.): volcanoes, cities, mythical figures, geographical capes and straits

Russia/Soviet Union

Russian (and Soviet) ship classes are formally named by the numbered project that designed them. That project sometimes, but not always, had a metaphorical name, and almost always had a NATO reporting name. In addition, the ships of the class would be numbered, and that number prefixed by a letter indicating the role of that type of  vessel. For example, Project 641 had no other name, though NATO referred to its members as s.

The ship classification in Russia (and formerly Soviet Union) does not completely correspond common designation, particularly for destroyer, frigate and corvette type ships. Russia has own classification for those ships. 

In Russia, there is a class of Squadron Torpedo Carriers that traditionally is adapted as Destroyers (formerly torpedo boats destroyers). The Russian corresponding word for destroyer is used in air force for fighter aircraft.

Also destroyers could be classified Russian Big Anti-submarine Ships or Big ASW Ships (e.g. Udaloy-class destroyer). At the same time Big Anti-submarine Ships could also be classified as cruisers (e.g. Kara-class cruiser). The Russian Big Anti-submarine Ships class also has its sub-class of Guard (or Patrol) Ships. 

The Russian Guard (or Patrol) Ships traditionally are reclassified as frigate (e.g. Gepard-class frigate).

Another substantial class in Russia (and formerly Soviet Union) is Small Anti-submarine Ships or Small ASW Ships and are adapted as corvettes (e.g. Grisha-class corvette).

As corvettes were adapted Russian Small Missile Ships (e.g. Buyan-class corvette) or Missile Boats (e.g. Tarantul-class corvette).

United Kingdom
The British Royal Navy (RN) has used several methods of naming classes. In addition to the accepted European convention, some classes have been named after a common theme in the included ships' names, e.g., s, and some classes were implemented as an organizational tool, making traditional methods of naming inefficient. Most destroyer classes were known by the initial letter used in naming the vessels, e.g., s. Classification by letter also helped to conflate similar smaller classes of ships as in the case of the A-class destroyers of 1913 whose names spread across the alphabet. Since the end of the Second World War, Royal Navy ship classes have also been known by their type number (e.g. Type 45 destroyer.)

United States

For the United States Navy, the first ship in a class to be authorized by Congress is the designated class leader and gives the name to the class, regardless of the order in which the ships of that class are laid down, launched or commissioned. Due to numbering conventions the lead ship often has the lowest hull number of her class. (During World War II the award of construction contracts was not always congruent with completion, so many ships had higher hull numbers than later-class ships.)

Before the 1920s naval vessels were classified according to shared characteristics, as evidenced by the Navy's own "Standard Nomenclature for Naval Vessels: General Order No. 541, 17 July 1920". Nonetheless, it has not prevented naval historians and scholars to retro-apply the current convention to historical naval vessels sharing similarities, those of the American Civil War for example, where the Union Navy in particular had built several vessels in series, which can be typified as "classes" as presently understood. Generally accepted by military historians and widely used in the more recent books, webpages and papers on the subject matter (most notably the releases of Osprey Publishing), these latter-day classifications are sometimes, but still unjustified, considered "semi-official". Contemporary records themselves however, show that the modern nomenclature was not in use at the time and never has been, certainly not in a formal sense as was unequivocally exemplified by the complete ships listing in "Official Records of the Union and Confederate Navies in the War of the Rebellion" (Series 2, Volume 1, Part 1), where vessels were classified according to the old fashioned descriptive conventions.

The unofficial retro-applying of ship classes can in some cases lead to confusion with researches. For example, while American reference works consistently adhere to the City-class and Columbia-class monikers, works of British origins (again, those of Osprey in particular) refer to the same classes as Cairo class and Tennessee class respectively, in compliance with the modern Royal Navy naming conventions. Yet, by the time the United States entered World War II, the naming convention was firmly in place, implying the practice had been formalized some time after July 1920, though it remains unclear as to exactly how and when the practice originated.

Merchant vessel class
Merchant ships are almost always classed by a classification society. These vessels are said to be in class when their hull, structures, machinery, and equipment conform to International Maritime Organization and MARPOL standards. Vessels out of class may be uninsurable and/or not permitted to sail by other agencies.  

A vessel's class may include endorsements for the type of cargo such as "oil carrier", "bulk carrier", "mixed carrier" etc. It may also include class notations denoting special abilities of the vessel.  Examples of this include an ice class, fire fighting capability, oil recovery capability, automated machinery space capability, or other special ability.

References

External links

Naval naming conventions

Ship classes